Buffalo most commonly refers to:

 True buffalo or Bubalina, a subtribe of wild cattle, including most "Old World" buffalo, such as water buffalo
 Buffalo (bison), a genus of wild cattle, including the American buffalo
 Buffalo, New York, a city in the northeastern United States
Buffalo or buffaloes may also refer to:

Animals
 Bubalina, a subtribe of the tribe Bovini within the subfamily Bovinae
African buffalo or Cape Buffalo (Syncerus caffer)
 Bubalus, a genus of bovines including various water buffalo species
Wild water buffalo (Bubalus arnee)
 Water buffalo (Bubalus bubalis)
 Italian Mediterranean buffalo, a breed of water buffalo
 Anoa
 Tamaraw (Bubalus mindorensis)
Bubalus murrensis, an extinct species of water buffalo that occupied riverine habitats in Europe in the Pleistocene
 Bison, large, even-toed ungulates in the genus Bison within the subfamily Bovinae
American bison (Bison bison), also commonly referred to as the American buffalo or simply "buffalo" in North America
European bison is also known as the European buffalo
 Aurochs, a primitive ox
Ictiobus, a North American genus of fish, known as buffalos

Places

Canada
 Buffalo, Alberta, a ghost town
 Buffalo National Park, Alberta
 Rural Municipality of Buffalo No. 409, Saskatchewan, a rural municipality
 Calgary-Buffalo, Alberta, a provincial electoral district
 Province of Buffalo, a proposed Canadian province

United States
 Buffalo, New York, the largest city by population with its name
Buffalo–Niagara Falls metropolitan area
Buffalo Niagara International Airport
 Buffalo, Illinois
 Buffalo, Indiana
 Buffalo, Iowa
 Buffalo, Kansas
 Buffalo, Kentucky
 Buffalo, Minnesota
 Buffalo, Missouri
 Buffalo, Montana
 Buffalo, Nebraska
 Buffalo, North Carolina
 Buffalo, North Dakota
 Buffalo, Guernsey County, Ohio
 Buffalo, Jackson County, Ohio
 Buffalo, Oklahoma
 Buffalo, South Carolina
 Buffalo, South Dakota
 Buffalo, Tennessee (disambiguation)
 Buffalo, Texas
 Buffalo, Henderson County, Texas
 Buffalo, West Virginia
 Buffalo, Jackson County, West Virginia
 Buffalo, Buffalo County, Wisconsin
 Buffalo, Marquette County, Wisconsin
 Buffalo, Wyoming

Elsewhere
 Buffalo, Victoria, Australia
 Buffalo City Metropolitan Municipality, Eastern Cape Province, South Africa

Multiple entities
 Buffalo City (disambiguation)
 Buffalo County (disambiguation)
 Buffalo Gap (disambiguation)
 Buffalo Township (disambiguation)
 Buffalo Trace (disambiguation)

Clothing
 Buffalo (footwear), a clothing brand
 Buffalo robe, a cured bison hide with the hair, used for saddles, blankets, and padding in carriages and sleighs
 Buffalo coat, a heavy winter coat made from a buffalo robe or hide

Coins
 American Buffalo (coin), a 24-karat bullion coin introduced 2006
 Buffalo nickel, a copper-nickel coin minted 1913–1938

Games
 Buffalo (card game), a card game
 Buffalo (game), a drinking game

Music
 Buffalo (band), an Australian hard rock group
 Buffalo (EP), by Buffalo
 Buffalo (Frank Zappa album)
 Buffalo (The Phoenix Foundation album)
 "Buffalo", by Tyler, the Creator from Cherry Bomb

People
 Chief Buffalo (disambiguation)
 Norton Buffalo (1951–2009), American singer-songwriter and musician
 Ted Buffalo (1885–1969), Native American football player
 Tishynah Buffalo, Indigenous Canadian fashion designer
 John Buffalo Mailer (born 1978), American writer and actor
 Black Buffalo (wrestler) (born 1974), Japanese professional wrestler
 Buffalo Bill, William Frederick "Buffalo Bill" Cody (1846–1917), an American scout, bison hunter, and showman

Schools
 University at Buffalo, known as Buffalo, is a public research university with campuses in Buffalo and Amherst, New York
 Buffalo State College, a public college in Buffalo, New York

Sport

Baseball
 Northern Territory Buffaloes, a defunct Australian baseball team
 Orix Buffaloes, a 2004–present Japanese baseball team
 Osaka Kintetsu Buffaloes, a 1950–2004 Japanese baseball team
 Buffalo Bisons, a professional minor league baseball team based in Buffalo, New York.

Basketball
 Ciego de Avila (basketball), a Cuban basketball team, nicknamed Búfalos

Football
 Buffalo Bills, a National Football League team
 Darwin Buffaloes, an Australian rules football team
 Green Buffaloes F.C., a Zambian football team
 K.A.A. Gent, a Belgian association football team
 South Africa national Australian rules football team, nicknamed the Buffaloes

Hockey
 Basingstoke Buffalo, an English ice hockey team
 Calgary Buffaloes, a 1966–67 Western Canada Junior Hockey League team
 Calgary Buffaloes (AJHL), a 1963–1966 Alberta Junior Hockey League team
 Buffalo Sabres, a National Hockey League team

Rugby
 Manitoba Buffalo, a Canadian rugby union team

Other uses in sport
 Colorado Buffaloes, the athletic teams of the University of Colorado Boulder
 Buffalo Bulls, the athletic teams of the University at Buffalo
 Milligan College Buffaloes, the athletic teams for Milligan College
 Vélodrome Buffalo and Stade Buffalo, cycling tracks in Paris

Technology

 Buffalo Inc., a Japanese technology company
 Buffalo AirStation, a line of wireless LAN equipment
 Buffalo network-attached storage series
 BUFFALO, the bootloader for the Freescale 68HC11 microcontroller family

Transportation

Air
 Buffalo Airways, a Canadian airline
 Avro 571 Buffalo, a 1920s prototype British biplane
 Brewster F2A Buffalo, a 1930s–1940s American fighter aircraft
 de Havilland Canada DHC-5 Buffalo, a 1965–1972 Canadian turboprop aircraft

Land
 Buffalo (mine protected vehicle)
 Buffalo (1901 automobile), a 1900–1902 American car
 Buffalo Electric Vehicle Company, a 1912–1915 American car company
 GM Buffalo bus
 South Devon Railway Buffalo class, a class of locomotives

Water
 , any of several Royal Navy ships
 , any of several U.S. Navy ships
 Landing Vehicle Tracked, a WWII-era amphibious vehicle

Other uses
 Buffalo wing, a style of chicken wing prepared with a spicy sauce coating, originally created in Buffalo, New York
 Royal Antediluvian Order of Buffaloes, a fraternal organisation
 Pistol-whipping, or "buffaloing", using a handgun as a blunt weapon

See also
 
 
 American buffalo (disambiguation)
 Buffalo Exchange, a fashion retailer
 Buffalo Soldier (disambiguation)
 Buffalo Trace (disambiguation)
 New Buffalo (disambiguation)
 Operation Buffalo (disambiguation)
 White Buffalo (disambiguation)
 Wood buffalo (disambiguation)
 Búfalo, a brand of hot sauce and other condiments
 Llama firearms Bufalo pistol
 Buffalo buffalo Buffalo buffalo buffalo buffalo Buffalo buffalo, a sentence illustrating homonyms and homophones

Animal common name disambiguation pages